Neotraditional country (also known as new traditional country and hardcore country) is a country music style that emphasizes the instrumental background and a traditional country vocal style. Neo-traditional country artists often dress in the fashions of the country music scene of the 1940s, 1950s, and 1960s. Reba McEntire, Alan Jackson, Patty Loveless, George Strait, Randy Travis, and Toby Keith are commonly associated with this style of music. Western music performers of neotraditional style music often emphasize their heritage genres, examples include those associated with the late Al Hurricane in New Mexico music, and modern honky-tonk bands like Midland in the Texas country music scene.

History
Neotraditional country rose to popularity in the mid-1980s, a few years after the so-called "outlaw movement," a previous "back-to-its-roots" movement, had faded in popularity. Neo-traditionalism was born as a reaction to the perceived blandness of the mainstream country music at the time, which had been influenced by the rise of the "urban cowboy" fad. New (or "neo-") traditionalism looked to the elders of country music like Ernest Tubb, Hank Williams, Kitty Wells and George Jones for inspiration, and was a precursor to the more general categorization known as new country. The creation of neo-traditionalism was also done in contrast to the more pop-oriented acts of the 1970s and 1980s, such as Ronnie Milsap and Anne Murray, along with the flood of former pop acts (see B.J. Thomas, Billy Joe Royal, The Osmonds, Bill Medley, Dan Seals, Exile and Juice Newton) switching to "country" to revive their careers.

In 1981, George Strait had made his musical debut with the album Strait Country. The album was based on an approach towards traditional country music and its subgenres of honky tonk, Western swing, and the Bakersfield sound. The album was considered a sharp contrast to the then current trends of country music, at the time relying on the "urban cowboy" country-pop scene. AllMusic critic Stephen Thomas Erlewine observed:
 It is with Strait Country that George Strait is credited with starting the neotraditional movement.

In the early 1980s, Ricky Skaggs, a picking prodigy who took his inspiration from Bill Monroe and Ralph Stanley (Skaggs was a Clinch Mountain Boy as a teen), began making music that he believed brought country back to its roots; Skaggs' style drew heavily on country's bluegrass vein.

Another neotraditional country artist was one of Skaggs' friends and former band-mate, Keith Whitley, who focused largely on countrypolitan ballads. After his success with "Don't Close Your Eyes", Whitley was said to be a promising new artist; however, in 1989, he died of what was officially listed as an alcohol overdose at the age of 34 (this diagnosis has since come into dispute). Despite his death, Whitley's sound remains influential among country artists. At that same time, artists like Emmylou Harris, John Anderson and Gail Davies, whose hits included re-makes of songs by Ray Price, Webb Pierce, Carl Smith, The Louvin Brothers and Johnnie & Jack, set the tone in the late '70s and early '80s. Following that, Randy Travis, Patty Loveless, and The Judds used vintage musical stylings, covers of classic country material, and carefully crafted vocal delivery to help bring New Traditionalism to the vanguard of country music for a time. Some of the last top-10 hits from a number of classic country stars (such as Merle Haggard, Conway Twitty, George Jones, and Don Williams) came during the neo-traditional boom of the late 1980s and into 1990.

As the mid-1980s approached, the pop country of the early 1980s was rapidly falling out of popularity as the Second British Invasion and MTV revolution took hold of American pop music, and country music sales overall had fallen to levels not seen since disco. The promotion of traditional country sounds was in part a retrenchment to appeal to the base of country music fans who remained loyal to the genre.

Neo-traditionalism, to a certain extent, fell out of favor in approximately 1991, when Billboard removed record sales from its country chart and a new brand of popular country music exploded into mainstream popularity, led in large part by Garth Brooks, Toby Keith, and Reba McEntire (who merged neotraditionalist styles, with stadium rock-influences). Despite this shift, of the acts that were still popular in the 1980s, more of the neo-traditional artists survived the shift into the 1990s than did those who did pop country in the 1980s tradition; Travis, Keith, Strait, McEntire, Loveless and newcomer Alan Jackson stayed true to the neo-traditional sound and continued to have mainstream success alongside their newer, more pop-oriented rivals.

In 2000, Strait and Jackson, both of whom remain popular as of the early 2020s, recorded a song titled "Murder on Music Row" which spoke directly to the rift between neo-traditionalists and pop-country musicians. The lyrics include scathing criticisms of the Nashville establishment such as "Someone killed tradition, and for that, someone should hang." Strait revisited the topic in his 2016 song "Kicked Outta Country," which noted that history was repeating itself at the time as artists like Strait were being marginalized just like artists such as Merle Haggard and George Jones had been in 1991. Jackson made similar remarks in his own song "Where Have You Gone," released at the same time as Strait's, remarking in an interview that he hoped that younger country musicians would embrace the traditional sound because as it stood, "country music is gone and it's not coming back." Travis rebutted that he and his wife were actively promoting younger traditional country artists.

References

Country music genres